Ideonella azotifigens is a nitrogen-fixing, Gram-negative, oxidase- and weak catalase-positive aerobic, motile bacterium from the genus Ideonella and  family Comamonadaceae, which was isolated from grass rhizosphere soil in Ithaca in the United States.

References

External links
Type strain of Ideonella azotifigens at BacDive -  the Bacterial Diversity Metadatabase

Comamonadaceae
Bacteria described in 2009